William Wesley Willoughby (born May 20, 1957) is an American former professional basketball player born in Englewood, New Jersey. After graduating from Dwight Morrow High School in Englewood, he was selected by the Atlanta Hawks in the 1975 NBA draft as the first pick in the second round (19th overall), bypassing college for a chance to play professionally. For his 1975–76 NBA season, he is the sixth youngest player ever to play an NBA game; he was the second youngest at the time, behind Stan Brown.

Playing career
While fellow notably young draftees Moses Malone (drafted into the American Basketball Association out of high school in 1974, prior to the 1976 ABA–NBA merger) and Darryl Dawkins enjoyed more successful professional careers, Willoughby had a career that was less distinguished. Nicknamed "Poodle" and “Son of Flubber”, he was a journeyman who played for six different NBA teams in eight years. Willoughby was tremendously athletic, having a 47-inch vertical leap. He had played center throughout his high school career, and was forced to play forward in the pros. On February 4, 1981, Willoughby scored a career high 21 points in a win against Dallas. After that season, Willoughby gained some fame in the 1981 NBA postseason by becoming one of the few players ever to block Kareem Abdul-Jabbar's "skyhook" at its apex. Willoughby and the Rockets later advanced to that year's 1981 NBA Finals, where he would play a key role in Houston's Game 2 92-90 win by scoring 14 points off the bench. Houston would go on to lose the series in six games. His professional playing career ended with the New Jersey Nets in 1984, at the age of 26.

Post playing career
Though he later regretted skipping college, Willoughby eventually received his degree in communications from Fairleigh Dickinson University in 2001, at the age of 44. The NBA fully paid all of his college expenses, and, in return, Willoughby is a special advisor to the NBA who counsels high school players considering forsaking college basketball for the NBA.

Willoughby currently resides in Hackensack, New Jersey.

References

External links
 
 
 https://web.archive.org/web/20151105203859/http://www.cleveland.com/nba/plaindealer/index.ssf?%2Fbase%2Fsports%2F116332455998560.xml&coll=2

1957 births
Living people
21st-century African-American people
African-American basketball players
American men's basketball players
Atlanta Hawks draft picks
Basketball players from New Jersey
Buffalo Braves players
Centers (basketball)
Cleveland Cavaliers players
Dwight Morrow High School alumni
Fairleigh Dickinson University alumni
Houston Rockets players
National Basketball Association high school draftees
New Jersey Nets players
Parade High School All-Americans (boys' basketball)
People from Englewood, New Jersey
Power forwards (basketball)
San Antonio Spurs players
Sportspeople from Hackensack, New Jersey
20th-century African-American sportspeople